Halensee is a station in the Halensee (former Wilmersdorf) district of Berlin.

Position
It is located at the prosaic western end of the Kurfürstendamm, one of Berlin's most famous and important boulevards and near the lake Halensee, after which the small locality of the city and the station take their names. The station is also served by four bus lines, two of which run continuously and one of which is an express service, as well as one line at night.

History

A first station named Grunewald south of the present platform opened on 15 November 1877 at the western Ringbahn railway line. It was shifted toward the Kurfürstendamm a few years later and reopened on 15 October 1884 as Halensee, including a Neo-Romanesque entrance building, while the present Berlin-Grunewald railway station received its name. Third rail S-Bahn service commenced on 6 November 1928. The entrance hall was heavily damaged by air raids in World War II and finally demolished in 1958.

However, the curve sees a handful of S46 trains each day and there is thus an infrequent service between the Ringbahn and the Stadtbahn.

References

Berlin S-Bahn stations
Buildings and structures in Charlottenburg-Wilmersdorf
Railway stations in Germany opened in 1877
Railway stations in Germany opened in 1884